Yevgeni Igorevich Kaleshin (born 20 June 1978) is a Russian professional football coach and a former player. He is the manager of FC Akron Tolyatti.

Club career
He made his debut in the Russian Premier League in 1999 for FC Shinnik Yaroslavl.

Coaching career
On 19 July 2018, Yevgeni Kaleshin was named as the head coach of the new FC Urozhay Krasnodar.

Personal life
He is the brother of Vitali Kaleshin and a son of Igor Kaleshin.

References

External links
 

1978 births
People from Maykop
Living people
Russian footballers
FC Shinnik Yaroslavl players
PFC Spartak Nalchik players
FC Lada-Tolyatti players
FC Tom Tomsk players
PFC Krylia Sovetov Samara players
FC Spartak Vladikavkaz players
Russian Premier League players
FC Volgar Astrakhan players
FC Krasnodar players
FC Chernomorets Novorossiysk players
FC Salyut Belgorod players
Association football defenders
Russian football managers
FC Kuban Krasnodar managers
FC Urozhay Krasnodar managers
FC Baltika Kaliningrad managers
FC Spartak-UGP Anapa players
Sportspeople from Adygea